Isaacs Creek is a  tributary stream of Back Creek in Frederick County, Virginia. Isaacs Creek rises on Timber Ridge at the boundary line with Hampshire County, West Virginia, and flows into Back Creek at Grave Hill shortly before Back Creek's confluence with Hogue Creek. The stream is dammed (along with Yeiders Run and other small streams) to create Lake Holiday.

Tributaries
Tributary streams are listed from headwaters to mouth.

Johnson Run
Nixon Run
Big Hollow Run
Yeiders Run
Miller Run
Little Isaacs Creek
Woodpile Hollow Run
Crockett Run

See also
List of Virginia rivers

References

Rivers of Frederick County, Virginia
Rivers of Virginia
Tributaries of the Potomac River